Sándor Burger (7 February 1899 – April 1978) was a sailor from Hungary, who represented his country at the 1928 Summer Olympics in Amsterdam, Netherlands.

Sources 

 

Sailors at the 1928 Summer Olympics – 6 Metre
Olympic sailors of Hungary
Hungarian male sailors (sport)
1899 births
1978 deaths
Sportspeople from Budapest
20th-century Hungarian people